The meridian 98° east of Greenwich is a line of longitude that extends from the North Pole across the Arctic Ocean, Asia, the Indian Ocean, the Southern Ocean, and Antarctica to the South Pole.

The 98th meridian east forms a great circle with the 82nd meridian west.

From Pole to Pole
Starting at the North Pole and heading south to the South Pole, the 98th meridian east passes through:

{| class="wikitable plainrowheaders"
! scope="col" width="120" | Co-ordinates
! scope="col" | Country, territory or sea
! scope="col" | Notes
|-
| style="background:#b0e0e6;" | 
! scope="row" style="background:#b0e0e6;" | Arctic Ocean
| style="background:#b0e0e6;" |
|-
| 
! scope="row" | 
| Krasnoyarsk Krai — Komsomolets Island, Severnaya Zemlya
|-
| style="background:#b0e0e6;" | 
! scope="row" style="background:#b0e0e6;" | Laptev Sea
| style="background:#b0e0e6;" |
|-valign="top"
| 
! scope="row" | 
| Krasnoyarsk Krai — October Revolution Island, Severnaya Zemlya
|-
| style="background:#b0e0e6;" | 
! scope="row" style="background:#b0e0e6;" | Kara Sea
| style="background:#b0e0e6;" |
|-valign="top"
| 
! scope="row" | 
| Krasnoyarsk Krai Irkutsk Oblast — from  Tuva Republic — from 
|-
| 
! scope="row" | 
|
|-
| 
! scope="row" | 
| Tuva Republic — For about 5 km
|-
| 
! scope="row" | 
| For about 13 km
|-
| 
! scope="row" | 
|Tuva Republic
|-
| 
! scope="row" | 
| 
|-valign="top"
| 
! scope="row" | 
| Inner Mongolia Gansu — from  Qinghai — from  Sichuan — from  Tibet — from 
|-
| 
! scope="row" |  (Burma)
|
|-valign="top"
| 
! scope="row" | 
| Yunnan
|-
| 
! scope="row" |  (Burma)
|
|-
| 
! scope="row" | 
|
|-
| 
! scope="row" |  (Burma)
|
|-
| style="background:#b0e0e6;" | 
! scope="row" style="background:#b0e0e6;" | Indian Ocean
| style="background:#b0e0e6;" | Andaman Sea
|-
| 
! scope="row" |  (Burma)
| Islands in the Mergui Archipelago, including Thayawthadangyi
|-
| style="background:#b0e0e6;" | 
! scope="row" style="background:#b0e0e6;" | Indian Ocean
| style="background:#b0e0e6;" | Andaman Sea
|-
| 
! scope="row" |  (Burma)
| Islands in the Mergui Archipelago
|-valign="top"
| style="background:#b0e0e6;" | 
! scope="row" style="background:#b0e0e6;" | Indian Ocean
| style="background:#b0e0e6;" | Andaman Sea — passing just west of the island of Lanbi Kyun,  (at )
|-
| 
! scope="row" |  (Burma)
| Islands in the Mergui Archipelago
|-valign="top"
| style="background:#b0e0e6;" | 
! scope="row" style="background:#b0e0e6;" | Indian Ocean
| style="background:#b0e0e6;" | Andaman Sea — passing just west of the island of Zadetkyi Kyun,  (at ) Strait of Malacca – from 
|-
| 
! scope="row" | 
| Island of Sumatra
|-valign="top"
| style="background:#b0e0e6;" | 
! scope="row" style="background:#b0e0e6;" | Indian Ocean
| style="background:#b0e0e6;" | Passing just east of the island of Nias,  (at ) Passing just west of the Batu Islands,  (at )
|-
| style="background:#b0e0e6;" | 
! scope="row" style="background:#b0e0e6;" | Southern Ocean
| style="background:#b0e0e6;" |
|-
| 
! scope="row" | Antarctica
| Australian Antarctic Territory, claimed by 
|-
|}

e098 meridian east